Cirsonella is a genus of small sea snails, marine gastropod molluscs in the family Skeneidae.

Description
(Original description by G. Angas) The minute, smooth shell is globosely turbinate. It is narrowly umbilicated. The aperture is circular. The continuous peristome is slightly thickened.

Species
Species within the genus Cirsonella include:
 † Cirsonella aedicula Laws, 1936 
 Cirsonella africana (Bartsch, 1915)
 † Cirsonella amplector Laws, 1944 
 Cirsonella ateles (Dautzenberg & H. Fischer, 1896) 
 Cirsonella carinata (Hedley, 1903)
 † Cirsonella congrua (Laws, 1941) 
 Cirsonella consobrina Powell, 1930
 Cirsonella cubitalis (Hedley, 1907)
 Cirsonella densilirata Suter, 1908 
 Cirsonella extrema Thiele, 1912
 Cirsonella floridensis (Dall, 1927)
 † Cirsonella funata Lozouet, 1998 
 Cirsonella gaudryi (Dautzenberg & Fischer H., 1896)
 Cirsonella georgiana (Dall, 1927)
 Cirsonella globosa (Pelseneer, 1903)
 Cirsonella kerguelenensis Thiele, 1912
 Cirsonella lata (Laseron, 1954)
 Cirsonella laxa Powell, 1937
 Cirsonella maoria Powell, 1937
 Cirsonella margaritiformis (Dall, 1927)
 Cirsonella microscopia (Gatliff & Gabriel, 1910)
 Cirsonella ovata Hedley, 1899
 Cirsonella paradoxa Powell, 1937
 Cirsonella parvula Powell, 1926
 Cirsonella pisiformis Powell, 1937
 † Cirsonella proava (Marwick, 1931) 
 Cirsonella propelaxa Dell, 1956
 Cirsonella reflecta Laseron, 1954
 Cirsonella romettensis (Granata-Grillo, 1877)
 Cirsonella variecostata Powell, 1940
 Cirsonella waikukuensis Powell, 1937
 † Cirsonella waimamakuica Laws, 1948 
 Cirsonella weldii (Tenison-Woods, 1877)
 † Cirsonella zeornata Laws, 1948 
Species brought into synonymy
 Cirsonella accelerans C. A. Fleming, 1948: synonym of Cirsonella variecostata Powell, 1940
 Cirsonella australis Angas, 1877: synonym of Cirsonella weldii (Tenison-Woods, 1877)
 Cirsonella granum Murdoch and Suter, 1906: synonym of Lissotesta granum (Murdoch & Suter, 1906)
 Cirsonella kerguelenensis [sic]: synonym of Cirsonella kerguelensis Thiele, 1912
 Cirsonella naticoides (Hedley, 1907): synonym of Cirsonella weldii (Tenison Woods, 1877)
 Cirsonella neozelanica Murdoch, 1899: synonym of Suterilla neozelanica (Murdoch, 1899) 
 Cirsonella perplexa Laseron, 1954: synonym of Cirsonella reflecta Laseron, 1954
 Cirsonella simplex Powell, 1937: synonym of Acremodontina simplex (Powell, 1937)
 Cirsonella translucida May, 1915: synonym of Acremodontina translucida (May, 1915)

References

 Angas, 1877 Proceedings of the Zoological Society of London, 1877: 38
 Iredale, T. & McMichael, D.F. (1962). A reference list of the marine Mollusca of New South Wales. Memoirs of the Australian Museum. 11 : 1-109
 Lozouet, P., 1998. Nouvelles espèces de gastéropodes (Mollusca: Gastropoda) de l'Oligocène et du Miocène inférieur d'Aquitaine (sud-ouest de la France). Cossmanniana 5(3-4): 61-102
 Gofas, S.; Le Renard, J.; Bouchet, P. (2001). Mollusca, in: Costello, M.J. et al. (Ed.) (2001). European register of marine species: a check-list of the marine species in Europe and a bibliography of guides to their identification. Collection Patrimoines Naturels, 50: pp. 180–213
 Spencer, H.; Marshall. B. (2009). All Mollusca except Opisthobranchia. In: Gordon, D. (Ed.) (2009). New Zealand Inventory of Biodiversity. Volume One: Kingdom Animalia. 584 pp

Further reading 
 Powell A. W. B., New Zealand Mollusca, William Collins Publishers Ltd, Auckland, New Zealand 1979 
 Taxonomicon info: 

 
Skeneidae
Gastropod genera